The Honda CBX400F is a motorcycle manufactured by Honda between 1981 and 1984.

z400FX

After the Dream CB400 Four, Honda made the Hawk series for mid-sized sports models which were powered by obsolete SOHC straight-twin engines. Those models were not popular in the market. In comparison, Kawasaki's Z400FX, powered by high-class inline-four engines, became a hit as a sports model in 1979.

XJ400 and GSX400F

In 1980, Yamaha and Suzuki introduced the XJ400 and GSX400F respectively, also powered by in-line-four engines. In addition, Yamaha introduced the RZ 250, with a water-cooled two-stroke engine, which is as powerful as 400cc class.

CBX400F

In order to break through the market and to address the demand to introduce an in-line-four engine model, Honda introduced the CBX400F in 1981.

Features

The CBX400F had; a compact body reminiscent of the CB400 Four, a meter panel resembling that of the CB750F, forged separated-handles, forged pedals, "x" shaped 4-1-2 exhaust pipe, hollowed aluminium swing arm with pro-link suspension, and ventilated disc brakes. Particularly, the engine produced 48 horsepower, when other 400cc class motorcycles could not. Its sophistication and high performance attracted the market and marked the highest sales among the sports models over the long run.

Integra

In 1982, the CBX400F Integra was introduced. For the first time in Japan, it was equipped with a fairing and a cancellation mechanism for turn signals. Its sister model, CBX550F Integra, was also introduced. An American-style, CBX 400 Custom was added in 1983.

CBR400F

When the racer replica boom started, the production of CBX400F was completed and CBR400F took over the position. However, there was residual demand for the CBX distinctly different from racer replicas and it was re-introduced in 1984, making the record total production unit number in the category of over 125cc. The record was not broken until 2003 by Yamaha YP400 Majesty.

Notes

Motorcycles introduced in 1981
CBX400F
Standard motorcycles